Isaác Brizuela Muñoz (born 28 August 1990), is a professional footballer who plays as a winger for Liga MX club Guadalajara. Born in the United States, he represented the Mexico national team.

Brizuela was born in the United States to Mexican parents who worked in California at the time. His family returned to their hometown of Lagos de Moreno, Jalisco, when he was two years old. He began playing football in his town until he was scouted to play for Toluca's youth squad in Guadalajara. Brizuela was promoted to the club's first-team squad in 2009 after good performances with the club's farm team, Atlético Mexiquense, from the second division. He also had a brief loan-spell with Atlas in 2013.

Club career

Toluca
Brizuela debuted with Toluca on 26 July 2009 in the 2009 Apertura against Guadalajara. He won the 2010 Bicentenario tournament with Toluca, his first professional championship. In January 2013 Brizuela was loaned to Atlas for six months in order to get more playing time. His successful campaign at Atlas, where he was crucial for the team finishing the 2013 Clausura in third place, entering the quarterfinals and avoiding relegation, prompted Toluca coach José Cardozo to include him in the club's squad once again.

International career
In May 2013, Brizuela revealed that he was born in San Jose, California, to Mexican parents even though he had initially reported to the FMF (Mexican Football Federation) that he was born in Lagos de Moreno, Jalisco. Therefore, he was eligible to play for either the United States and Mexico. Mexico head coach José Manuel de la Torre listed Brizuela in Mexico's 35-man preliminary squad for the Gold Cup due to his good performances with Atlas. He was subsequently included in the final 23-player squad.
Brizuela made his first competitive appearance for Mexico with the senior squad in a 2013 CONCACAF Gold Cup match against Panama that also, given his dual US-Mexican citizenship, cap-tied him to Mexico. He was included in Miguel Herrera 23-man world cup squad, but didn't appear in any matches.

Career statistics

International

Honours
Toluca
Mexican Primera División: Bicentenario 2010

Guadalajara
Liga MX: Clausura 2017
Copa MX: Apertura 2015, Clausura 2017
Supercopa MX: 2016
CONCACAF Champions League: 2018

Mexico U23
Pan American Games: 2011

Individual
CONCACAF Champions League Best XI: 2018

References

External links
 
 Isaác Brizuela at Univision Deportes 
 
 

1990 births
Living people
Soccer players from California
Association football forwards
Mexican footballers
Mexico international footballers
American sportspeople of Mexican descent
Footballers at the 2011 Pan American Games
Deportivo Toluca F.C. players
Atlético Mexiquense footballers
Atlas F.C. footballers
C.D. Guadalajara footballers
Liga MX players
2013 CONCACAF Gold Cup players
2014 FIFA World Cup players
Pan American Games gold medalists for Mexico
Pan American Games medalists in football
Medalists at the 2011 Pan American Games